The Warkworth 30m Radio Telescope is a radio telescope at the Warkworth Radio Astronomical Observatory, located just south of Warkworth, New Zealand, about 50km north of the Auckland CBD. It is operated by the Institute for Radio Astronomy and Space Research, Auckland University of Technology. Originally used for international communication, the university was formally granted a licence to operate the Warkworth 2 antenna by Telecom New Zealand in November 2010.

Technical information
The telescope is a 30-metre Cassegrain wheel-and-track beam waveguide antenna. It was manufactured in 1983 by Nippon Electric Corp., and was first used by Telecom NZ for communication between New Zealand and the Pacific Islands.

Gallery

See also
 Warkworth Radio Astronomical Observatory
 Warkworth 12m Radio Telescope
 Radio astronomy
 Radio telescope
 List of radio telescopes

References

External links
 http://www.icrar.org/news/news_items/dish_repurposed_in_new_zealand
 http://www.computerworld.com.au/article/368812/telecom_nz_gives_satellite_dish_aut/
 http://www.stuff.co.nz/auckland/local-news/rodney-times/4350642/Astronomers-eye-old-satellite-dish

Radio telescopes
Astronomical observatories in New Zealand